Cryptophlebia illepida is a species of moth in the family Tortricidae that is endemic to the islands of Kauai, Oahu, Molokai, Maui, Lānai and Hawaii. Common names include koa seedworm, klu tortricid, koa seed moth, litchi borer, litchi moth, macadamia nut borer and macadamia nut moth. It was first described by Arthur Gardiner Butler in 1882.

The wingspan is 12–25 mm. It is an extremely variable species.

The larvae feed on a wide range of plants. Recorded food plants are Acacia confusa, Acacia farnesiana, Acacia koa, Acacia koaia, Alectryon macrococcus, Caesalpinia kavaiensis, Dodonaea viscosa, Inga edulis, Litchi chinensis, Macadamia ternifolia, Mangifera indica, Phaseolus, Pithecellobium dulce, Sapindus oahuensis, Sapindus saponaria, and Senna surattensis. They are particularly fond of the developing seeds of Acacia. Each larva may eat several seeds and may leave one seed pod and enter another. In addition to feeding on the seeds, the larvae also feed upon the pulp of the pods. The larvae are whitish and often have a pink tinge.

The pupal period lasts 8–12 days. When the pupa is first formed it is light brown, then gradually becomes darker, and when time for adult emergence it is almost black.

External links

Grapholitini
Moths described in 1882
Endemic moths of Hawaii